The 1940 Detroit Lions season was their 11th in the league. The team failed to improve on their previous season's output of 6–5, winning only five games. They failed to qualify for the playoffs for the fifth consecutive season.

Due to a dispute between new Lions owner Fred Mandel and Detroit Tigers owner Walter Briggs, the Lions played the entire 1940 home schedule at University of Detroit Stadium.

Schedule

Note: Intra-division opponents are in bold text.

Standings

References

External links 
1940 Detroit Lions at Pro Football Reference
1940 Detroit Lions at jt-sw.com
1940 Detroit Lions at The Football Database

Detroit Lions seasons
Detroit Lions
Detroit Lions